The 9th Maryland Volunteer Infantry Regiment was an infantry regiment that served in the Union Army during the American Civil War.

Service
The 9th Maryland Infantry was organized at Baltimore, Maryland, June-July 1863 for six months service under the command of Colonel Benjamin L. Simpson.

The regiment was attached to 1st Brigade, Maryland Heights, Division of West Virginia, to December 1863. 1st Brigade, 1st Division, West Virginia, to February 1864.

The 9th Maryland Infantry mustered out of the service at Baltimore on February 24, 1864.

Detailed service
Moved from Baltimore to western Maryland July 6, 1863. Occupation of Maryland Heights July 7, 1863. At Loudon Heights until August. Guard duty on the Baltimore & Ohio Railroad. Company B at Duffield Station, Company C at Brown's Crossing, Companies A and B served provost duty at Harpers Ferry, Companies D, E, F, G, H, and I at Charles Town, West Virginia, until October 18. Attacked by Brigadier General John D. Imboden and captured. Companies A, B, and C on duty in West Virginia until February 1864. Moved to Baltimore for muster out.

Commanders
 Colonel Benjamin L. Simpson

Casualties
The regiment lost a total of 126 men during service, 2 enlisted men killed or mortally wounded and 124 enlisted men due to disease.

See also

 List of Maryland Civil War Units
 Maryland in the American Civil War

References
 Dyer, Frederick H.  A Compendium of the War of the Rebellion (Des Moines, IA:  Dyer Pub. Co.), 1908.
 Wilmer, L. Allison. History and Roster of Maryland Volunteers, War of 1861-5 (Baltimore, MD:  Press of Guggenheimer, Weil, & Co.), 1898.
Attribution
 

Military units and formations established in 1863
Military units and formations disestablished in 1864
Units and formations of the Union Army from Maryland
1863 establishments in Maryland